Holstein-Plön was the name of a county ruled by the House of Schauenburg that ruled in Holstein and Stormarn from 1110/11. The county emerged before 1295 when the County of Holstein-Itzehoe was partitioned after the death of Count Gerhard I of Holstein-Itzehoe (died 1290) into the counties of Holstein-Plön, Holstein-Pinneberg and Holstein-Rendsburg.

The following counts ruled over Holstein-Plön:

 1295 – 1312 Gerhard II the Blind (born 1253; died 1312), married Agnes of Brandenburg (born after 1255; died 1304), daughter of John I of Brandenburg, in 1293
 1312 – 1314 Gerhard IV (died before 1320), dean (Dompropst) of Lübeck Cathedral, 1300–1311
 1312 – 1359 John III the Mild (born ca. 1296; died 1359)
 1323 – 1350 Gerhard V (born ca. 1315; died 1350) was never a ruler, but only a landowner and canon at Lübeck Cathedral
 1321 – 1359 John III the Mild, also Count of Holstein-Kiel and Lord of Fehmarn
 1359 – 1390 Adolphus VII (died 1390), also Count of Holstein-Kiel and Lord of Fehmarn

Following the death of Gerhard II his sons, Gerhard IV of Holstein-Plön and his younger half-brother John III, ruled jointly over Holstein-Plön. In 1314 Gerhard IV sold his lands to John III, who thus became the sole Count of Holstein-Plön. John III conquered Holstein-Kiel with Gerhard III of Holstein-Rendsburg. Holstein-Plön reverted to Holstein-Kiel in 1350 upon the death of 27-year-old Gerhard V without issue.

When the Plön line died out in 1390, Holstein-Kiel (and Holstein-Plön within it) reverted to Holstein-Rendsburg, ruled by Count Nicholas of Holstein-Rendsburg (died 1397) and his nephew, Count Gerhard VI of Holstein-Rendsburg (died 1404). A circa-1400 map of the region shows the borders of Holstein-Rendsburg and its subordinate counties, Holstein-Kiel and Holstein-Plön.

Rise and fall of the county 

 
Plon
Counties of the Holy Roman Empire
Holstein
Former monarchies of Europe